Oligopeptidase B (protease II, Escherichia coli alkaline proteinase II) is an enzyme. This enzyme catalyses the following chemical reaction

 Hydrolysis of -Arg-, -Lys- bonds in oligopeptides, even when P1' residue is proline

This enzyme is present in Escherichia coli.

References

External links 
 

EC 3.4.21